Auliekol (Äulieköl), known as Semiozernoye until 1997, is a village and the administrative center of Auliekol District in Kostanay Region of north-western Kazakhstan.

References

Populated places in Kostanay Region